Erratic Cinematic is the debut studio album by the Scottish singer-songwriter and acoustic guitarist Gerry Cinnamon. It was released on 28 September 2017 by LR Records. The album peaked at number 17 on the UK Albums Chart. The album includes the singles "Belter" and "Sometimes".

Track listing

Charts

Weekly charts

Year-end charts

Release history

References

2017 albums
Gerry Cinnamon albums